The 2022 Singapore Sevens was a rugby sevens tournament played on 9–10 April 2022 at the National Stadium in Singapore. It was the ninth edition of the Singapore Sevens and the fifth tournament of the 2021–22 World Rugby Sevens Series. This was the first event in the series for which no invited teams featured in tournament, and all core teams were available.

In the cup final, it was Fiji who took out their record third Singapore title after they defeated New Zealand by 28–17. Australia narrowly defeated Ireland by 21–19 to finish in third place. The defending tournament champions from 2019, South Africa, finished in equal-seventh place, and also lost their thirty-six match win streak in the pool stage against the United States by 7–12. Following South Africa's loss in the pool stage, they lost back-to-back in the knockout stage to Fiji (19–14) and Argentina (22–15), respectively.

Format
The sixteen teams were drawn into four pools of four. Each team played the three opponents in their pool once. The top two teams from each pool advanced to the Cup bracket, with the losers of the quarter-finals vying for a fifth place finish. The remaining eight teams that finished between either third or fourth in their pool played off for 9th place, with the losers of the 9th-place quarter-finals competing for 13th place.

Teams 
The sixteen national teams competing in Singapore were:
 
  
 
 
 
 
 
 
  
 
 
 
 
 
 
 
 
  

Fiji returned from their absence since playing at the Dubai II event in November 2021.
  
New Zealand returned to the Sevens Series for the first time since the 2020 Vancouver event on 8 March 2020.

Samoa also played their first tournament of the series in Singapore, returning after a similar hiatus to the New Zealand team.

Pool stage

Key:  Team advanced to the quarterfinals

Pool A

Pool B

Pool C

Pool D

Knockout stage

13th–16th playoffs

9th–12th playoffs

5th–8th playoffs

Cup playoffs

Placings

See also
 2022 Canada Women's Sevens

Notes

References

External links
 Tournament site  

2022
2021–22 World Rugby Sevens Series
2022 rugby sevens competitions
April 2022 sports events in Singapore
Singapore Sevens